Frederick Edmund Knowles (21 July 1901 – 1991) was an English footballer who played in the Football League for Derby County.

References

1901 births
1991 deaths
English footballers
Association football forwards
English Football League players
Derby County F.C. players